Phumzile Khanyile (born 1991) is a South African photographer, living in Johannesburg. Her series Plastic Crowns is about women's lives and sexual politics. The series has been shown in group exhibitions at the Palace of the Dukes of Cadaval in Evora, Portugal; Iziko South African National Gallery in Cape Town; and the National Gallery of Victoria in Melbourne, Australia; and was a winner of the CAP Prize for Contemporary African Photography,

Early life and education
Khanyile was born in Tladi, Soweto, South Africa. She studied photography at the Market Photo Workshop from 2013.

Life and work
Plastic Crowns is a series of self-portraits while dressed in her grandmother's clothes, with whom she lives. The series is concerned with the female experience of relations between the sexes, in terms of power. It is "an exploration of shame, and an unpacking of the expectations Khanyile inherited from her grandmother about what it means to be a woman"—"stereotypical ideas of gender, sexual preference and related stigmas and their relevance in contemporary society". It employs a snapshot aesthetic, "as if they're from a private journal", "raw and out-of-focus [. . . ] as much from the family album snapshot as the rough urban glamour of postwar Japanese photography". Plastic Crowns came about through Khanyile spending a lot of time indoors, having been too "scared to leave her house since she was attacked on the streets."

Khanyile and Nkosinathi Khumalo direct the Johannesburg project space Zulu Republik.

Publications

Publications by Khanyile
Plastic Crowns. Johannesburg: Market Photo Workshop.

Publications with contributions by Khanyile
Afrotopia. Paris: Dilecta, 2017. Ministère de la Culture du Mali; Institut Français. With texts by Marie-Ann Yemsi, Felwine Sarr, Thulie Gamedze, Cédric Aurelle. . Published on the occasion of African Photography Encouters, Bamako, Mali, 2017/2018.
Paris Nude. By Mary McCartney. London: HENI, 2019. .
Africa State of Mind: Contemporary Photography Reimagines a Continent. London: Thames & Hudson, 2020. .

Exhibitions

Solo exhibitions
Plastic Crowns, Market Photo Workshop, Johannesburg, South Africa, 2017

Group exhibitions
African Passions, Palace of the Dukes of Cadaval, Evora Africa (African art and music festival), Evora, Portugal, 2018. Included work from Plastic Crowns.
Not the Usual Suspects, Iziko South African National Gallery, Cape Town, South Africa, 2018/2019. A tribute to the Market Photo Workshop. Included work from Plastic Crowns.
NGV Triennial, National Gallery of Victoria, Melbourne, Australia, 2020/2021.  Included work from Plastic Crowns.

Awards
2015: Gisèle Wulfsohn Mentorship in Photography, from the Market Photo Workshop and the family and friends of Wulfsohn. Mentorship with Ayana V. Jackson.
2018: 1 of 5 winners, CAP Prize for Contemporary African Photography, for Plastic Crowns

References

External links
Khanyile's profile at Afronova Gallery, Johannesburg

21st-century women photographers
People from Soweto
South African women photographers
South African photographers
Date of birth missing (living people)
Living people
1991 births